Gunnar Nielsen Aaby (9 July 1895 in Frederiksberg, Hovedstaden, Denmark – 22 August 1966 in Gribskov, Hovedstaden, Denmark) was a Danish soccer player in the 1920s.

At the 1920 Men's Olympic Football Tournament, his team lost to the Spanish team.

References

1895 births
1966 deaths
Danish men's footballers
Association football forwards
Footballers at the 1920 Summer Olympics
Olympic footballers of Denmark
Sportspeople from Frederiksberg